Dr. C. David Florida (ca. 1914-19 January 1971) was a Canadian pioneer in space research. He was director of the Canadian National Space Telecommunications Laboratory and manager of the International Satellites for Ionospheric Studies (ISIS) programme. He was the first manager of the Hermes Communications Technology Satellite (CTS) programme just prior to his death in 1971.

The Satellite Assembly and Test Facility was renamed the David Florida Laboratory in his honor.

References

External links
 Canadian Space Agency - David Florida Laboratory FAQ

1971 deaths
Canadian space scientists
Year of birth uncertain
20th-century Canadian scientists